Liam Nimmo (born 28 December 1984) is an English former footballer who played as a striker.

He played in the Football League for Grimsby Town during the 2003–2004 season.

Career

Nimmo was born in Boston, Lincolnshire. He began his football career at Grimsby Town and earned himself a professional contract in October 2003. He was added to a squad which was rich with attacking force and boasted such players as Iffy Onuora, Michael Boulding, Phil Jevons and Isaiah Rankin.

On 12 September 2003, Nimmo made his Grimsby debut, as a 61st-minute substitute for Jonathan Rowan in an 8–1 defeat at Hartlepool United in League One. Nimmo played in Grimsby's next game, again as substitute, but that was his last first-team appearance before he was released at the end of the season.

In August 2004 he signed for Spalding United, finishing the season as their leading scorer, before joining Wisbech Town in June 2005. After two prolific seasons at Wisbech, he joined Holbeach United. After a few months at Holbeach where his goalscoring continued, Nimmo chose to move to Conference North club Gainsborough Trinity, three levels above Holbeach in the league structure. After turning down a move to Boston United, Nimmo returned to Holbeach in July 2008, feeling that a back injury prevented him doing himself justice at the higher level. He walked out of the club shortly after the start of the 2008–09 season and joined Bourne Town, but returned to Holbeach once more after only one game for Bourne.

Nimmo moved on to Bourne Town, before moving back to Holbeach in 2009. He moved to Boston Town in 2010, and in July 2011 he signed for Wisbech Town.

References

External links
 

1984 births
Living people
People from Boston, Lincolnshire
English footballers
Association football forwards
Grimsby Town F.C. players
Spalding United F.C. players
Wisbech Town F.C. players
Holbeach United F.C. players
Gainsborough Trinity F.C. players
Bourne Town F.C. players
Boston Town F.C. players
English Football League players